Netco or NETCO is the name or acronym for several companies and products

N.E. Thing Co., a Canadian art collective from 1967-78
Netco Government Services, a network infrastructure company in the United States
Netco (Somalia), a telecommunications company in Somalia